The 1969–70 Phoenix Suns season was the second season of the Phoenix Suns in the National Basketball Association (NBA). It was the first season, however, for eventual Hall of Famer Connie Hawkins, who was a star in the ABA before switching to the NBA to join the Suns. Head coach Johnny "Red" Kerr was replaced by general manager Jerry Colangelo after the Suns started 15–23. All home games were played at Arizona Veterans Memorial Coliseum.

Hawkins led the Suns in scoring with 24.6 points per game, which was also sixth in the league. He teamed with Dick Van Arsdale's 21.3 points to create the highest-scoring season for a Suns duo until the 1977–78 Suns season, when Paul Westphal and Walter Davis combined for 49.4 points.

After a 16–66 finish in 1968–69, Hawkins and the Suns made a 23-game improvement to 39–43, making their first playoff appearance in only their second season. Facing off against Wilt Chamberlain, Jerry West, Elgin Baylor and the Los Angeles Lakers in the Western Division Semifinals, the Suns took an improbable 3–1 lead, before falling to the Lakers in seven games. The Suns wouldn't return to the playoffs again until their cinderella run to the NBA Finals in 1976.

Offseason

NBA draft

Prior to the inception of the NBA Draft Lottery, the first pick in the draft was decided by a coin flip between the teams with the worst record in the league's two divisions. The NBA's two expansion teams from 1968, the Suns (16–66) and the Milwaukee Bucks (27–55), finished last in the Western Division and Eastern Division, respectively. Prior to the flip, Suns general manager Jerry Colangelo chose "heads", losing the first pick to the Bucks when the coin landed "tails". According to Jerry Colangelo, the coin flip originally landed on heads from what he heard on the phone, but then-commissioner J. Walter Kennedy flip the coin onto his hand to showcase tails instead. The Bucks would select prized UCLA center Lew Alcindor (later Kareem Abdul-Jabbar) with the first pick. Alcindor, in three years at UCLA, led the Bruins to three national championships and an 88–2 record. Considered by many to be the greatest college basketball player of all-time, Abdul-Jabbar would lead the Bucks to a championship in just his second season, and would eventually win six Most Valuable Player awards, six NBA Championships, and retire as the NBA's all-time leading scorer.

The Suns would use the second pick to select center Neal Walk from Florida. Walk averaged 25.2 points and 18.4 rebounds per game in his final two seasons with the Gators. Walk would play five seasons with the Suns before being traded to the New Orleans Jazz in 1974. While overshadowed by Abdul-Jabbar, Walk was productive for the Suns, averaging a double-double in two consecutive seasons (20.2 points and 12.4 rebounds in 1972–73 and 16.8 points and 10.2 rebounds in 1973–74). The only other draft pick who played for the franchise was Lamar Green, who, like Walk, would play five seasons with the Suns before being drafted by the Jazz in the 1974 Expansion Draft. "Leapin' Lamar" was known for his vertical leap and rebounding ability, averaging a career high 9.3 rebounds per game in 1972–73 while playing 25.6 minutes a game. In the fifteenth round, the Suns selected Bob Beamon, a famous track and field athlete who broke Jesse Owens' 25-year world record in the long jump at the 1968 Summer Olympics.

Free agency
Despite losing the number one draft pick to the Bucks, the Suns would win another significant coin flip. The Suns bested the Seattle SuperSonics for the rights to ABA star Connie Hawkins. In his freshman year with Iowa, Hawkins was implicated, without evidence, in a point shaving scandal, which led to his expulsion from the university. While eligible, Hawkins went undrafted in the 1964, 1965 and 1966 NBA drafts, before being officially barred from the league. Hawkins would star in the upstart American Basketball League (ABL), winning the Most Valuable Player Award in the ABL's inaugural 1961–62 season. Hawkins would then spend four years with the Harlem Globetrotters, before joining the Pittsburgh Pipers of the upstart American Basketball Association (ABA) in 1967. Hawkins led the league in scoring, while leading the Pipers to the first ABA championship, and receiving the ABA's first Most Valuable Player Award in 1968. In 1966, Hawkins' attorneys filed a $6 million anti-trust lawsuit against the NBA. In 1969, a Time Magazine article absolved Hawkins from involvement in the point shaving scandal, leading the NBA to pay a $1.3 million settlement and allow Hawkins into the league. "The Hawk" would become the Suns first official star, making the All-NBA First Team in 1970, and appearing in four consecutive All-Star Games. On November 19, 1976, Hawkins became the first player in Suns franchise history to have his number retired. On September 11, 1969, the Suns waived swingman Bob Warlick. Warlick would sign as a free agent with the Los Angeles Stars of the ABA. On October 1, 1969, Dave "Big Daddy D" Lattin was waived. Lattin would later sign with the Pittsburgh Condors of the ABA.

Trades
On May 8, 1969, the Suns traded Gary Gregor to the Atlanta Hawks for Paul Silas. Gregor, the Suns first draft pick, was named to the All-Rookie Team in 1969 after averaging 11.1 points and 8.9 rebounds per game. Silas would join Connie Hawkins and Jim Fox to form a formidable starting frontcourt that would combine to average over 50 points and 29 rebounds a game. As a Sun, Silas would become an All-Star, and be selected to two All-Defensive teams. The Suns also traded the rights to expansion draft picks Bill Melchionni and Bumper Tormohlen for a 1970 second-round draft pick (Joe DePre) and a 1970 third-round draft pick (Vann Williford). Neither pick would play for the franchise.

Roster
{| class="toccolours" style="font-size: 85%; width: 100%;"
|-
! colspan="2" style="background-color: #423189;  color: #FF8800; text-align: center;" | Phoenix Suns roster
|- style="background-color: #FF8800; color: #423189;   text-align: center;"
! Players !! Coaches
|-
| valign="top" |

Team-by-team results

Playoffs

Game log

|- align="center" bgcolor="#ffcccc"
| 1
| March 25
| @ Los Angeles
| L 112–128
| Paul Silas (26)
| Paul Silas (18)
| Connie Hawkins (6)
| The Forum15,046
| 0–1
|- align="center" bgcolor="#ccffcc"
| 2
| March 29
| @ Los Angeles
| W 114–101
| Connie Hawkins (34)
| Connie Hawkins (20)
| Hawkins, Van Arsdale (7)
| The Forum17,501
| 1–1
|- align="center" bgcolor="#ccffcc"
| 3
| April 2
| Los Angeles
| W 112–98
| Gail Goodrich (29)
| Paul Silas (16)
| Connie Hawkins (9)
| Arizona Veterans Memorial Coliseum12,324
| 2–1
|- align="center" bgcolor="#ccffcc"
| 4
| April 4
| Los Angeles
| W 112–102
| Gail Goodrich (34)
| Paul Silas (16)
| Gail Goodrich (11)
| Arizona Veterans Memorial Coliseum12,356
| 3–1
|- align="center" bgcolor="#ffcccc"
| 5
| April 5
| @ Los Angeles
| L 121–138
| Connie Hawkins (28)
| Connie Hawkins (19)
| three players tied (5)
| The Forum17,475
| 3–2
|- align="center" bgcolor="#ffcccc"
| 6
| April 7
| Los Angeles
| L 93–104
| Connie Hawkins (24)
| Paul Silas (21)
| Goodrich, Van Arsdale (4)
| Arizona Veterans Memorial Coliseum12,386
| 3–3
|- align="center" bgcolor="#ffcccc"
| 7
| April 9
| @ Los Angeles
| L 94–129
| Connie Hawkins (25)
| Connie Hawkins (15)
| Hawkins, Silas (4)
| The Forum17,519
| 3–4
|-

Awards and honors

All-Star
 Connie Hawkins was voted as a starter for the Western Conference in the All-Star Game. Hawkins led all Western Conference forwards in voting. It was his first All-Star selection in the NBA.
 Dick Van Arsdale was selected as a reserve for the Western Conference in the All-Star Game. It was his second consecutive All-Star selection.

Season
 Connie Hawkins was named to the All-NBA First Team. Hawkins also finished fifth in MVP voting.

Player statistics

Season

* – Stats with the Suns.
^ – Minimum 70 games played.

Playoffs

Transactions

Trades

Free agents

Additions

Subtractions

References

Phoenix Suns seasons
Phoenix